Acerpenna pygmaea, the tiny blue-winged olive, is a species of small minnow mayfly in the family Baetidae. It is found in all of Canada and the continental United States.

References

Mayflies
Articles created by Qbugbot
Insects described in 1861